Lisa Kendall Damour (born 7 November, 1970) is an American clinical psychologist and author specializing in the development of teenage girls and young women.

Early life and education 
Born in Denver, Colorado, Damour was raised in Denver, London, and Chicago. She graduated from Denver's Manual High School in 1988 before attending Yale University. After graduating with honors from Yale, Damour worked for the Yale Child Study Center. She then received her doctorate in clinical psychology at the University of Michigan.

Throughout these years, she held fellowships from Yale's Edward Zigler Center in Child Development and Social Policy, the University of Michigan's Power Foundation, and the Pediatric AIDS Foundation.

Career 
Damour maintains a private psychotherapy practice while also serving as senior advisor to the Schubert Center for Child Studies at Case Western Reserve University and executive director of Laurel School’s Center for Research on Girls.

Damour has published academic papers, chapters, and books related to education and child development, including two editions of the college textbook Abnormal Psychology with James Hansell (2005, 2008) and three editions of First Day to Final Grade with Anne Curzan (2000, 2006, 2011).

Her first New York Times best seller, Untangled: Guiding Teenage Girls Through the Seven Transitions into Adulthood (Random House, 2016), describes the seven distinct developmental transitions that turn girls into grown-ups.

Damour's 2019 book, Under Pressure: Confronting the Epidemic of Stress and Anxiety in Girls (Random House), examines sources of stress and anxiety for adolescents and ways that adults can support them. Under Pressure was a New York Times best seller.

The Emotional Lives of Teenagers: Raising Connected, Capable, and Compassionate Adolescents (Random House, 2023), another New York Times best seller, helps parents understand the emotional lives of their teenagers and support them through that developmental stage.

Damour writes about adolescents for The New York Times and is a regular contributor to CBS News and UNICEF.

Personal life 
Damour lives in Shaker Heights, Ohio, with her husband and two daughters.

Honors and awards 
In 2016, Damour received a Books for a Better Life: Childcare and Parenting Award for Untangled. In 2019, Damour was recognized as a Thought Leader by the American Psychological Association.

Books 
First day to final grade: A graduate student's guide to teaching, with Anne Curzan, 2000, 2006, 2011.  
Abnormal psychology, with James Hansell, 2005, 2008. 
Untangled: Guiding teenage girls through the seven transitions into adulthood, 2016.  
Under pressure: Confronting the epidemic of stress and anxiety in girls, 2019.  
The Emotional Lives of Teenagers: Raising Connected, Capable, and Compassionate Adolescents, 2023.

External links 

UNICEF: Expert advice on parenting in a pandemic
UNICEF: How to build your baby's mental health master class
UNICEF: Three self-care tips for parents during COVID-19

References 

Yale University alumni
University of Michigan alumni
1970 births
Living people